Terri Meyette is a Yaqui poet known for her anti-colonialist writings. Her work was published in A Gathering of Spirit.

References 

Yaqui people
American lesbian writers
American women poets
20th-century American poets
American LGBT poets
LGBT Native Americans
Native American poets
20th-century American women writers
Native American women writers
Indigenous Mexican women
Year of birth missing (living people)
Living people